Persicula frumentum is a species of sea snail, a marine gastropod mollusk, in the family Cystiscidae.

References

frumentum
Cystiscidae
Gastropods described in 1832